Desert Dust is a 1927 American silent Western film directed by William Wyler and starring Ted Wells, Lotus Thompson and Bruce Gordon.

The film's sets were designed by the art director David S. Garber.

Cast
 Ted Wells as Frank Fortune 
 Lotus Thompson as Helen Marsden 
 Bruce Gordon as 'Butch' Rorke 
 Jimmy Phillips as The Rat 
 Slim Cole as The Parson 
 George Ovey as Shorty Benton 
 Richard L'Estrange as Slim Donovan

References

External links
 

1927 films
1927 Western (genre) films
American black-and-white films
Films directed by William Wyler
Universal Pictures films
Silent American Western (genre) films
1920s English-language films
1920s American films